Walter Chetwynd, 1st Viscount Chetwynd (3 June 1678 – 21 February 1736), of Rudge and Ingestre, Staffordshire was a British Whig politician who sat in the House of Commons between 1702 and 1734.

Chetwynd was the eldest son of John Chetwynd of Ingestre and his wife Lucy Roane, daughter of Robert Roane of Tullesworth, Chaldon, Surrey, and was baptized on 3 June 1678. In 1693 he succeeded to the Ingestre estates on the death of his cousin Walter Chetwynd (1633–1693). He was educated at Westminster School from 1692 to 1696 and matriculated at Christ Church, Oxford on 28 May 1696, aged 18. He married Mary Berkeley, daughter of John Berkeley, 4th Viscount Fitzhardinge on 27 May 1703.

Chetwynd was returned unopposed as Member of Parliament for Stafford at a by-election on 26 December 1702 on the death of his father. In 1705 he was appointed joint Master of Buckhounds to Prince George of Denmark. He was returned as MP for Stafford again in 1705 and 1708. In 1709 he was appointed sole Master of the Buckhounds to Queen Anne. He was re-elected MP for Stafford in 1710 but was unseated on petition on 25 January 1711. He regained the seat at a by-election on 24 January 1712 and held it in the 1713 general election. In 1714 he was appointed ranger of St. James's Park.

Chetwynd was returned again as MP for Safford in 1715. In 1717 he was elevated to an Irish Peerage as Viscount Chetwynd, with special remainder to his father's descendants. In the same year he was appointed high steward of Stafford. He lost his seat at the 1722 general election but was returned again at a by-election on 4 February 1725. He was returned again in 1727 but did not stand in 1734.

Chetwynd died on 21 February 1736. He and his wife had no children, so that his title and estates devolved upon his brother, John.

References

|-

1678 births
1736 deaths
People from the Borough of Stafford
English MPs 1702–1705
English MPs 1705–1707
Members of the Parliament of Great Britain for Stafford
British MPs 1707–1708
British MPs 1708–1710
British MPs 1710–1713
British MPs 1713–1715
British MPs 1715–1722
British MPs 1722–1727
British MPs 1727–1734
Viscounts in the Peerage of Ireland
Peers of Ireland created by George I
Masters of the Buckhounds
Members of the Parliament of England (pre-1707) for Stafford